Ismoil Somoni Peak (Tajik: Қуллаи Исмоили Сомонӣ, Qulla-i Ismō‘il-i Sōmōnî/Qullaji Ismojili Somonī;) is the highest mountain in Tajikistan. Because it was within the territory of the former Russian Empire and the former Soviet Union, it was the highest mountain in the Russian Empire and Soviet Union before Tajikistan became independent. The mountain is named after Ismail Samani, a ruler of the Samanid dynasty. It is located in the Pamir Range.

Name
When the existence of a peak in the Soviet Pamir Mountains higher than Lenin Peak was first established in 1928, the mountain was tentatively identified with Mount Garmo. However, as the result of the work of further Soviet expeditions, it became clear by 1932 that they were not the same, and in 1933 the new peak, in the Academy of Sciences Range, was named Stalin Peak, after Joseph Stalin. In 1962, as part of Khrushchev's nationwide de-Stalinization process, the name was changed to Communism Peak, a name by which it is still commonly known. The name Communism Peak was officially dropped in 1998 in favour of the current name, commemorating the 9th-10th century Samanid emir, Ismail Samani.

History
The first ascent (to the then Stalin Peak) was made 3 September 1933 by the Soviet mountaineer Yevgeniy Abalakov.

See also
 List of highest mountains on Earth
 Lenin Peak
 Peak Korzhenevskaya
 Mount Garmo
 Patkhor Peak
 List of elevation extremes by country
 Extreme points of Tajikistan

References
 The Free Dictionary: Imeni Ismail Samani Peak

External links
 
 

Mountains of Tajikistan
Seven-thousanders of the Pamir
Highest points of countries
De-Stalinization